mpowerplayer was a technology-startup company based in Reston, Virginia, just outside of Washington, D.C. The company offers a solution for the video game industry (game publishers and mobile operators) to enable their customers to browse and demo mobile games on their web browser before buying them. Customers include Sprint-Nextel, EA Mobile and Sega Mobile.

Technically mpowerplayer's platform is a Java ME emulator for devices capable of running Java SE. In May 2008, the company was awarded with the Duke's Choice Award in the mobile gaming category from Sun Microsystems.

Funding
Following its launch from tech incubator LaunchBox Digital, on 11 September 2008 it was announced that mpowerplayer had raised $2.5 million in its first round of funding. Funding comes from New Atlantic Ventures, the Center for Innovative Technology GAP Fund and LaunchBox Digital. The company plans to use the funding to expand their presence and their widget-based mobile game catalog on more social networking sites.

References

External links
 mpowerplayer site 

Java device platform
Mobile game companies
Mobile software
Software distribution platforms